Khaneh Dam (also Romanized as Khāneh Dām; also known as Khanadam, Khanasam, Khāndām, Khandam, Khānedām, and Khāneh Sām) is a village in Lakestan Rural District, in the Central District of Salmas County, West Azerbaijan Province, Iran. In the 2006 census, its population was 264, in 68 families.

References 

Populated places in Salmas County